Mäntymäki is a district of the city of Turku, in Finland. It is located to the south of the city centre, between Kurjenmäki and Vähäheikkilä.

The current population of Mäntymäki is 1,489, and it is decreasing at an annual rate of 0.34%. 10.28% of the district's population are under 15 years old, while 21.76% are over 65. The district's linguistic makeup is 90.33% Finnish, 6.85% Swedish, and 2.82% other.

See also
 Districts of Turku
 Districts of Turku by population

Districts of Turku